Ethiopian Americans are Americans of Ethiopian descent, as well as individuals of American and Ethiopian ancestry.

History
In 1919, an official Ethiopian goodwill mission was sent to the United States to congratulate the Allied powers on their victory during the First World War. The four-person delegation included Dejazmach Nadew, the nephew of Empress Zawditu and Commander of the Imperial Army, along with Blattengeta Heruy Welde Sellase, Mayor of Addis Ababa, Kentiba Gebru, Mayor of Gondar, and Ato Sinkas, Dejazmach Nadew's secretary.

After his official coronation, Emperor Haile Selassie sent forth the first wave of Ethiopian students to continue their education abroad. Almost a dozen Ethiopian students likewise went to the United States. They included Makonnen Desta, who studied anthropology at Harvard, and later became an interim Ethiopian Minister of Education; Makonnen Haile, who studied finance at Cornell; and Ingida Yohannes, veterinary medicine at New York University. Three other students - Melaku Beyen, Besha Worrid Hapte Wold, and Worku Gobena - went to Muskingum, a missionary college in Ohio, two of them later transferring to the Ohio State University. Melaku Beyan, who was one of the two who attended Ohio State, later received his medical degree at Howard Medical School in Washington, D.C.

Overall, approximately 20,000 Ethiopians moved to the West to achieve higher education and conduct diplomatic missions from 1941 to 1974 under the Selassie's rule. However, the net movement of permanent immigrants remained low during this period as most temporary immigrants ultimately returned to Ethiopia with a Western education to near assured political success, while the relative stability of the country determined that few Ethiopians would be granted asylum in the United States.

The passing of the 1965 Immigration Act, the Refugee Act of 1980, as well as the Diversity Visa Program of the Immigration Act of 1990, contributed to an increased emigration from Ethiopia to the United States, prompted by political unrest during the Ethiopian Civil War. The majority of Ethiopian immigrants arrived later in the 1990s, following the Eritrean–Ethiopian War. Immigration to the U.S. from Ethiopia during this 1992-2002 period averaged around 5,000 individuals per year.

Ethiopian Americans have since established ethnic enclaves in various places around the country, particularly in the Washington D.C., and Minneapolis-Saint Paul areas. Fairfax Avenue in Los Angeles, California, has also come to be known as Little Ethiopia, owing to its many Ethiopian businesses and restaurants, as well as a significant concentration of residents of Ethiopian and Eritrean ancestry.

Ethiopian Jews in the United States 
Since the 1990s, around 1,000 Hebrew-speaking, Ethiopian Jews that had settled in Israel as Ethiopian Jews in Israel re-settled in the United States as Ethiopian Americans, with around half of the Ethiopian Jewish Israeli-American community living in New York.

Demographics

According to the U.S. Census Bureau, approximately 68,001 people reported Ethiopian ancestry in 2000. Between 2007 and 2011, there were approximately 151,515 Ethiopia-born residents in the United States. According to Aaron Matteo Terrazas, a former policy analyst at the Migration Policy Institute, "if the descendants of Ethiopian-born migrants (the second generation and up) are included, the estimates range upwards of 460,000 in the United States (of which approximately 250,000 are in Washington, D.C.; 96,000 in Los Angeles; 20,000 in New York and 12,000 in Philadelphia)." Unofficial estimates suggest that the Washington, D.C., area has an Ethiopian population of 150,000 to 250,000.

The states, including Washington D.C., with the most people of Ethiopian ancestry by percentage are:

 Washington D.C. - 1.1% Ethiopian
 Maryland - 0.39% Ethiopian
 Virginia - 0.35% Ethiopian
 Minnesota - 0.34% Ethiopian
 Nevada - 0.33% Ethiopian
 Washington - 0.3% Ethiopian
 Colorado - 0.18% Ethiopian
 South Dakota - 0.18% Ethiopian
 Georgia - 0.17% Ethiopian
 California - 0.09% Ethiopian
 Oregon - 0.09% Ethiopian

Ethiopians are the second-largest immigrant group in both South Dakota and Washington, D.C.

Culture

Many Ethiopian Americans are followers of Abrahamic religions, particularly Christianity and Islam. Of these, the majority of Christians belong to the Ethiopian Orthodox Tewahedo Church. It is the largest Christian denomination in Ethiopia. Most Muslim Ethiopian expatriates adhere to the Sunni school. Other Ethiopian immigrants follow the P'ent'ay denomination of Christianity or Judaism. There has been a general religious revival among Ethiopian Americans, especially in the Orthodox sect. Church attendance in America has also increased relative to that in Ethiopia, and the institutions serve to preserve aspects of Ethiopian culture among American-born Ethiopians. They also act as networks and support systems crucial to the well-being of both recent immigrants from Ethiopia and more established Ethiopian residents. Ethiopian churches in the US are gathering places for the Ethiopian community, where Ethiopian expatriates come together to pray, socialize, stay in touch, and lend support to one another.

For many individuals living within the Ethiopian diaspora, musical performance acts as a uniting social force that allows Ethiopian immigrants in the US to explore their shared culture and identity, while simultaneously partaking in political expression and advocacy. Through public performances (e.g. cultural events on college campuses), these traditions are shown to communities of outsiders who are interested in Ethiopian music and dance within an American context. Such folkloric performances, often based in religion, feature sacred songs performed in various languages of Ethiopia, with instrumental accompaniments and traditional choreographed dances.

Geographic distribution

Washington, D.C.

By far, the largest concentration of Ethiopians in the United States are found in Washington, D.C. and the local metro area. Some conservative estimates put the number at around 75,000 residents, while other figures go up to 250,000. The Ethiopian Community Center was opened in 1980 to serve the area's Ethiopian residents. Ethiopian businessmen have also helped revitalize the Shaw and U Street vicinities. Although they mainly live in other parts of the capital, these entrepreneurs purchased old residential property, which they then renovated and converted into new office spaces, restaurants and cafes. Additionally, Ethiopian businessmen in the District of Columbia own various parking garages, taxi firms, social establishments, grocery stores, and travel agencies.

New York City

As of 2012, there were 4,610 Ethiopia-born persons in the New York metropolitan area.

New York Abay Ethiopian Sports Club (NYAESC), and its local football team, is located in the Bronx borough of the city. The Ethiopian football team is usually sited in Van Cortlandt Park, where some Ethiopian marathoners are also found practicing, including New York City Marathon finisher Bizunesh Deba.

Seattle 
An estimated 25,000 to 40,000 Ethiopians live in Seattle, Washington, with many more living in the surrounding metropolitan area. The first Ethiopian organization in Seattle, the Ethiopian Refugee Association, was founded in 1983 and continues today under the name Ethiopian Community Mutual Association. The Seattle area is also home to three Amharic-language radio programs, as well as an Amharic newspaper and radio program. Many Ethiopians live in the neighborhoods of Rainier Beach and the Central District, and Ethiopian restaurants are a fixture of the city's cuisine.

Other places

In 2011, around 44,600 Ethiopian residents were officially registered in the Dallas-Fort Worth metroplex. However, DFW International estimates that the Ethiopian community is much larger, with about 50,000 members.

The Ethiopian population in Minnesota is one of the most diverse, with a large representation of Amhara and Oromo Ethiopians. The official census shows 34,927 Ethiopian-Americans living in Minnesota, while MPR estimates that 40,000 ethnic Oromos live in the state alongside many Somali Americans.

In Ohio, there is a significant Ethiopian community in Greater Cleveland, and the Columbus metropolitan area is home to approximately 40,000 Ethiopians.

There is an Ethiopian community in Las Vegas. Around 40,000 Ethiopians live in Clark County, Nevada.

Notable people

See also
 Ethiopia–United States relations
Little Ethiopia, Los Angeles
Ethiopians in the United Kingdom
Ethiopian Australians
Ethiopian Canadians
Ethiopians in Washington, D.C.
History of Ethiopian Americans in Baltimore

References

Further reading
 Getahun, Solomon Addis. The History of Ethiopian Immigrants and Refugees in America, 1900-2000: Patterns of Migration, Survival, and Adjustment (New York: LFB Scholarly Pub., 2007).
 Kobel, Paul S. "Ethiopian Americans." Gale Encyclopedia of Multicultural America, edited by Thomas Riggs, (3rd ed., vol. 2, Gale, 2014), pp. 107–118. online
 McVety, Amanda Kay. Enlightened Aid: U.S. Development as Foreign Policy in Ethiopia. New York: Oxford University Press, 2012.
 Metaferia, Getachew. Ethiopia and the United States: History, Diplomacy, and Analysis (2009) online
 Ofcansky, Thomas P., and LaVerle Berry. Ethiopia: A Country of Study (Washington, D.C.: Library of Congress, 1993). online
 Shelemay, Kay Kaufman, and Steven Kaplan, eds. Creating the Ethiopian diaspora: Perspectives from across the disciplines. Tsehai Publishers, 2015. Also as: Shelemay, Kay Kaufman and Steven Kaplan. "Creating the Ethiopian diaspora: perspectives from across the disciplines." Diaspora 15, no. 2-3 (2006): 191–395.
 Shelemay, Kay Kaufman. 2009. Music of the Ethiopian American diaspora: A preliminary overview. In Proceedings of the 16th International Conference of Ethiopian Studies: July 2–6, 2007, Trondheim, Norway, ed. by Svein Ege, Harald Aspen, Birhanu Teferra and Shiferaw Bekele, 1153–64. Wiesbaden: Harrassowitz. Web access 

 
 
 
Horn Africans in the United States
United States
African-American society